PSP Swiss Property is one of Switzerland’s largest real estate companies with approximately 160 office and commercial properties as well as several development sites and individual construction projects. Most of the properties are located in the economic centres of Zurich, Geneva, Basel, Bern and Lausanne. The main use of the properties is offices and retail.

The portfolio’s total value is around 7 billion francs, while rental income adds up to 280 million. The company has 90 employees in Zurich, Geneva and Olten as well as the holding domicile in Zug.

PSP Swiss Property was founded by the insurance company Zurich in 1999 and listed at the SIX Swiss Exchange in an initial public offering (IPO) in March 2000. Ever since, the company has focused exclusively, as a pure play real estate company, on commercial properties in Switzerland. PSP Swiss Property pursues a conservative financing policy with an equity ratio exceeding 50% and correspondingly low debt.

References 

 NZZ, 12. November 2016: PSP Swiss Property ist weiterhin gut unterwegs 
 Finanz und Wirtschaft, 8. März 2017: Sesselrücken bei PSP Swiss Property
 Private Magazin, Q1 2017: PSP Swiss Property – Schweizer Qualitätsimmobilien

Real estate companies of Switzerland
Companies listed on the SIX Swiss Exchange